Otto Lederer (April 17, 1886 – September 3, 1965) was a Czech-American film actor. He appeared in 120 films between 1912 and 1933, most notably The Jazz Singer, the first full-length film to have sound sequences, and the Laurel and Hardy short You're Darn Tootin'. 

In 1925, Lederer married Segunda Yriondo. They were divorced on July 10, 1929. He later married actress Gretchen Lederer. Otto is entombed at Forest Lawn Memorial Park Cemetery.

Selected filmography

 Captain Alvarez (1914)
 A Natural Man (1915)
 Captain of the Gray Horse Troop (1917)
 The Flaming Omen (1917)
 Aladdin from Broadway (1917)
 The Magnificent Meddler (1917)
 By Right of Possession (1917)
 When Men Are Tempted (1917)
 The Changing Woman (1918)
 The Woman in the Web (1918)
 Cupid Forecloses (1919)
 Over the Garden Wall (1919)
 The Little Boss (1919)
 The Dragon's Net (1920)
 The Spenders (1921)
 The Avenging Arrow (1921)
 Without Benefit of Clergy (1921)
 White Eagle (1922)
 Forget Me Not (1922)
 The Gown Shop (1923)
 Your Friend and Mine (1923)
 The Sword of Valor (1924)
 A Fighting Heart (1924)
 Behind Two Guns (1924)
 Turned Up (1924)
 Virginian Outcast (1924)
 Wizard of Oz (1925)
 Borrowed Finery (1925)
 Cruise of the Jasper B (1926)
 The Trunk Mystery (1926)
 That Model from Paris (1926)
 Sweet Rosie O'Grady (1926)
 The Jazz Singer (1927)
 The King of Kings (1927)
 The Shamrock and the Rose (1927)
 You're Darn Tootin' (1928)
 A Bit of Heaven (1928)
 Celebrity (1928)
 Gun Law (1933)

References

External links

1886 births
1965 deaths
American male film actors
American male silent film actors
Austro-Hungarian emigrants to the United States
Jewish American male actors
Jewish Austrian male actors
20th-century American male actors
Burials at Forest Lawn Memorial Park (Glendale)